Victims of Stalinism is a topic of disagreement among scholars of Communism. It may also refer to:
 Excess mortality in the Soviet Union under Joseph Stalin
 Stalinist repressions (disambiguation)

See also 
 Comparison of Nazism and Stalinism
 Double genocide theory